In the year 1999, Brazil produced a gross domestic product (GDP) of R$44,403,000 million or US$2,223,737 million in nominal terms, ranking 7th worldwide, and Int$2,896,461 million in Purchasing Power Parity (PPP) terms, ranking 7th worldwide, according to the Brazilian Institute of Geography and Statistics (IBGE) and the International Monetary Fund (IMF). In that year, the Brazilian economy grew 1.0% in real terms according to revised figures of the IBGE. The per capita accounts of the GDP were R$22,813.47 or US$11.521,95 in nominal terms, and Int$14,537.40 in PPP terms. The Brazilian population, in 2012, was 193,300,291, ranking 5th worldwide and totaling 2.84% of the world's population.

Brazil is formed by the union of 27 federative units—26 states and the Federal District, which contains the capital city, Brasília. Of these, seven states; São Paulo, Rio de Janeiro, Minas Gerais, Rio Grande do Sul, Paraná, Bahia and Santa Catarina; with the Federal District, constitute almost 80% of the national economy. São Paulo is the richest and most populous state in Brazil, ranking 16th and 27th worldwide, respectively; Rio de Janeiro is the second richest and the third most populous state, ranking 65th and 59th worldwide; Minas Gerais is the third richest and the second most populous state, ranking 80th and 55th worldwide. Piauí has the lowest GRP per capita at the same time that the Federal District has the highest. Amapá, Acre and Roraima are the poorest states in the country with 0.59% of the national GDP.

List 
The listings are based on data from the 2016 Regional Accounts Report, published by the Brazilian Institute of Geography and Statistics (IBGE), in partnership with the State Bodies of Statistics, State Departments of Government and the Superintendency of the Manaus Free Zone (SUFRAMA). Information is compiled from statistics on the annual value of production, intermediate consumption and added value of each economic activity, as well as indicators of growth in the volume of annual production and the annual index of prices of goods and services produced and the main inputs consumed. The methodology and database of the Report is completely integrated to the series of National Accounts, which has as initial reference the year 2002, with results consistent with the National Classification of Economic Activities (CNAE).

See also 
 States of Brazil
 Economy of Brazil
 List of country subdivisions by GDP over 100 billion US dollars
 List of subnational entities

Note 
 Annual average exchange rates used for GDP in US$: According to the UN Countries GDP list, the GDP 2014 of Brazil is R$5,778,953 million or US$2,455,816 million, It is estimated that the average exchange rate was R$2.35317 per US$1 in 2014.

References 

 
 

Brazil, GDP
Brazilian states by GDP
GDP
Federative units by gross regional product